The Harvard Humanitarian Initiative (HHI) is an interfaculty Harvard University initiative dedicated to advancing research, practice, and policy in the field of humanitarian assistance. HHI's mission is "to relieve human suffering in war and disaster by advancing the science and practice of humanitarian response worldwide".

History
In 1999, Harvard University established a program on humanitarian crises and human rights at the François-Xavier Bagnold Center for Health and Human Rights in response to growing interest in humanitarian response. 
By 2002, the demand for technical expertise and educational and training opportunities from NGO partners, professionals, and graduate students overwhelmed the capacity of the existing program. In 2005, Michael VanRooyen, MD, MPH and Jennifer Leaning, MD, SMH and established the Harvard Humanitarian Initiative as a University-wide academic and research center to address issues of evidence-based humanitarian interest. In 2010, Michael VanRooyen became Director of HHI. In 2011, HHI launched the Humanitarian Academy at Harvard, an educational arm of HHI and the first Humanitarian Academy of its kind.

Mission
The mission of the Harvard Humanitarian Initiative (HHI) is to conduct research and education on the practice of relieving human suffering in war and disaster by advancing the science and practice of humanitarian response worldwide by conducting interdisciplinary, practice-based research and education that can be used by scholars, policymakers, NGOs, and others fosters interdisciplinary collaboration in order to: 
 Improve the effectiveness of humanitarian strategies for relief, protection, and prevention; 
 Instill human rights principles and practices in these strategies; and 
 Educate and train the next generation of humanitarian leaders.

Affiliations
The Initiative is supported by Harvard's Office of the Provost, and has faculty participation from the Harvard School of Public Health, Harvard Medical School, Harvard Faculty of Arts and Sciences, Harvard Kennedy School, Harvard Business School, Harvard Law School, Harvard Graduate School of Education, Harvard University Committee on Human Rights Studies, Radcliffe Institute for Advanced Study, and Harvard-affiliated medical centers including Brigham and Women's Hospital, Children's Hospital Boston, and Beth Israel Deaconess Medical Center.

In addition, the HHI has maintained partnerships with major relief organizations and government agencies to improve the effectiveness of aid delivery worldwide. HHI has emerged as a source for technical, research, and training assistance to more than 40 humanitarian agencies and international institutions, including: American Red Cross, AmeriCares, CARE, International Committee of the Red Cross (ICRC), International Rescue Committee (IRC), Médecins Sans Frontières, Oxfam America, Physicians for Human Rights (PHR), Save the Children USA, United Nations High Commissioner for Refugees (UNHCR), U.S. Agency for International Development (USAID), U.S. Centers for Disease Control and Prevention (CDC), World Health Organization (WHO), and the African Development Bank.

Current projects

HHI has major programs in four key thematic areas:  Populations in Crisis, Humanitarian Data and Technology, Disaster Resilience, and Humanitarian Policy and Evaluation. HHI collaborates with NGOs, UN agencies, governments and universities to improve the quality, accountability, and effective of humanitarian aid in war, conflict and disaster."

Darfur, Sudan and Chad:

HHI conducts research, analysis, and response to the humanitarian crises in Sudan and Chad.

Gender-based Violence Initiative:

HHI's Program on Gender-based Violence explores complex issues relating to women and war by addressing the health, human rights, and advocacy needs of women affected by conflict.  HHI's work has included collaboration with the Democratic Republic of Congo's Panzi Hospital and extensive research into the causes and impacts of mass rape as a weapon of war.

Crisis Mapping and Conflict Early Warning:

HHI's current research seeks to identify alternative approaches to community-based conflict early warning and response strategies, crisis mapping and use of information communication technology in areas of conflict worldwide.

Humanitarian Studies Initiative:

The Humanitarian Studies Initiative (HSI) is a humanitarian response curriculum taught by Harvard University professors and humanitarian experts. The course focuses  on refugee camp management, water sanitation, sexual violence prevention, NGO management, and international humanitarian law.

References

Further reading and resources
Gettleman, Jeffrey (2007-10-07), "Rape Epidemic Raises Trauma of Congo War", The New York Times. Retrieved on 21 April 2008.
Harvard Public Health Now, "Twelve Myths and Misconceptions in Disaster Response," by Michael Lasalandra, February 1, 2008.
Koinange, Jeff (2006-05-26), "Rape, brutality ignored to aid Congo peace", CNN.com. Retrieved on 21 April 2008.
Meir, Patrick. "Crisis Mapping and Early Warning".  Retrieved on 8 July 2008.
Mullin, Lisa.  Public Radio International's The World, “Interview with Dr. Julia VanRooyen, a surgeon with the Harvard Humanitarian Initiative”.
Scientific American, The Science of Doing Good, by Sheri Fink, October 2007.
Think Tank for Aid Workers, Harvard Magazine, November 2007.

External links 

 Official website

Harvard University
1999 establishments in Massachusetts